Manarola (Manaea in the local dialect) is a small town, a frazione of the comune (municipality) of Riomaggiore, in the province of La Spezia, Liguria, northern Italy. It is the second-smallest of the famous Cinque Terre towns frequented by tourists, with a population of 353.

Overview

Manarola may be the oldest of the towns in the Cinque Terre, with the cornerstone of the church, San Lorenzo, dating from 1338. The local dialect is Manarolese, which is marginally different from the dialects in the nearby area. The name "Manarola" is probably a dialectical evolution of the Latin, " Magna rota". In the Manarolese dialect, this was changed to "Magna roea" which means "large wheel", about the mill wheel in the town.

Manarola's primary industries have traditionally been fishing and wine-making. The local wine, called Sciacchetrà, is especially renowned; references from Roman writings mention the high quality of the wine produced in the region.  In recent years, Manarola and its neighboring towns have become popular tourist destinations, particularly in the summer months.  Tourist attractions in the region include a famous walking trail between Manarola and Riomaggiore (called Via dell'Amore, "Love's Trail") and hiking trails in the hills and vineyards above the town. Manarola is one of the five villages of the Cinque Terre. Most of the houses are bright and colourful. Manarola was celebrated in paintings by Antonio Discovolo (1874–1956).

Culture

Presepe di Manarola

Since 1961, during the Christmas season, an evocative luminous nativity scene has been set up on the hill overlooking the village, whose characters, handcrafted by Mario Andreoli, a retired railwayman, are made up of thousands and thousands of lights on special templates that give the representation a unique charm in the world.
Andreoli built the original nucleus of the crib figures, of what was consecrated in 2007 as the largest nativity scene in the world. The statues were made with recycled materials. The lighting of the luminous nativity scene takes place every year on December 8.

In the days before December 8, 2022, the date on which the Nativity scene was lit, Andreoli had requested that the fireworks be made, an event not foreseen in recent years. On 22 December 2022, Andreoli died at the age of 94.
His work in the creation of the crib, its preparation and conservation will be managed and preserved by the association that takes his name, established on November 2, 2017.

Via Crucis 
In addition to the famous crib, during the Easter period, Andreoli created a luminous Via Crucis on the same hill.

Festa di San Lorenzo
While for the Festa di San Lorenzo, Andreoli created a luminous representation of the saint on the grill, place of martyrdom.

In popular culture
Like its fellow Cinque Terre town of Riomaggiore, it was featured in the video game Forza Horizon 2. Manarola was not featured as the main location but was referenced on various road signs. It is also the inspiration for the Dorado map in the video game Overwatch.

The Cinque Terre towns, Manarola included, are the inspiration for the town of Portorosso in the 2021 animated film Luca.

See also
Riomaggiore
Vernazza
Monterosso al Mare
Corniglia

Notes

External links

 Virtual tour, Manarola
 Manarola photoblog

Coastal towns in Liguria
Frazioni of the Province of La Spezia
Italian Riviera
World Heritage Sites in Italy